Scaredy Squirrel is a children's book series written and illustrated by Canadian author Mélanie Watt. The books have won several awards. The first book of the Scaredy Squirrel series was published in March 2006 by Kids Can Press. A television series based on the books began in 2011.

Premise 
The stories are told using large pictures with simple descriptive text. The books often follow the same format, the titular protagonist Scaredy Squirrel identifies his fears, shows how he avoids them at all costs, and develops contingency plans, which usually involve an emergency kit and playing dead till the threat has passed. Scaredy is inevitably faced with the fears he tries so hard to avoid, eventually learning that it is not as bad as he initially imagined. However, he only slightly alters his strict daily routines after these experiences.

Books 
The first book, Scaredy Squirrel, introduces the main character, a nervous squirrel, who is afraid of many things and keeps safe in his tree, following an intricate routine. One day he has an unexpected visitor, which he thinks is a "killer bee". The terrified squirrel takes a leap into the unknown and discovers to his surprise that he is a flying squirrel. An animated short film of the same title, directed by Galen Fott, was released in 2011 by Weston Woods.

Scaredy Squirrel Makes a Friend, was published in March 2007 by Kids Can Press. In it, Scaredy decides to leave his nut tree and find the perfect friend; he must be germ free, toothless and completely predictable. With meticulous planning and preparation Scaredy sets off with rubber gloves and air freshener in hand, but the friend he finds is not what he had in mind at all. The story also spawned an animated short, directed by Galen Fott.

A third Scaredy Squirrel title, Scaredy Squirrel at the Beach, was published in March 2008. In this book, Scaredy Squirrel has the perfect plan to have some 100% safe fun in the sun by building a beach getaway under his nut tree, complete with a germ-free inflatable pool and plastic flamingo. Still, a crucial part of the beach is missing — the sound of the ocean – so with his meticulous map and worst-case scenario contingency plan, Scaredy sets off to bring home the perfect seashell. But he's keeping an eye out for menacing seagulls, pinching lobsters, scary sharks, falling coconuts and camera-shy sea monsters.

A fourth Scaredy Squirrel book, Scaredy Squirrel at Night, was published in February 2009. In the book, Scaredy Squirrel does not want to go to sleep for fear of dreaming about things such as dragons, fairies, ghosts, bats, unicorns, and polka-dot monsters. However, one night Scaredy is forced to take drastic measures when his horoscope says that at midnight his dreams will come true. What Scaredy ends up confronting is very different from fairies and polka-dot monsters. This book was also adapted to a film in 2015.

A fifth Scaredy Squirrel book, Scaredy Squirrel Has a Birthday Party, was published in 2011. In the book, Scaredy Squirrel does not want to have a big birthday party for fear of it being spoiled by clownfish, ants, ponies, Bigfoot, confetti or porcupines. He was going to invite only himself to his birthday party, but someone sends him a happy birthday card and Scaredy thinks he has to return the favor and invite him to his party. His Buddy comes to the party with a bunch of other dogs. Scaredy realizes it is much more fun when there are a lot of party friends.

Awards

American
Won:

ALA’s Notable Children's Books 
Independent Publisher Book Awards – Picture Books 6 and under (Bronze)
Children's and YA Bloggers' Literary Awards (Cybils)
NCTE Notable Children's Books in Language Arts

Shortlisted:

ReadBoston 2006 Best Read Aloud Book Award
ForeWord Book of the Year Award
Washington Children's Choice Picture Book Award
North Carolina Children's Book Award – Picture Book

Canadian
Won:

Ruth and Sylvia Schwartz Children's Book Award for Children’s Picture Book
OLA Blue Spruce Award 2007 & 2008
Amelia Frances Howard-Gibbon Illustrator's Award

Shortlisted:

CBA Libris Award for Children’s Author of the Year

International
Won:

Le Prix de la Librairie Millepage in Vincennes, 2006 (France)

Selection:

Richard & Judy Book Club Selection (UK)

TV series

A 52-episode series that aired on YTV, Nickelodeon (Canada) & Teletoon (Canada), Cartoon Network (United States/Australia/New Zealand/Latin America), and POP, Challenge TV, Sky One, ITV (TV network) and CITV (United Kingdom), Disney XD (France/Poland), True Spark (Thailand). The English version of the show's titular character is voiced by Terry McGurrin.

The series is very loosely based on the books.

References

Text

External links
Wayback Machine
Scaredy Squirrel Archives - Kids Can Press
Melanie Watt

American picture books
Series of children's books
Canadian children's books
Animal tales
2006 children's books
Works about fear
Anthropomorphic squirrels